Forficula davidi is a species of earwig.

Forficulidae